Edward Lyons, QC (17 May 1926 – 23 April 2010) was a British politician.

Early life
Lyons was born in Glasgow and then the family moved to Leeds. He was educated at Roundhay School and Leeds University. Following World War II, he worked as a Russian interpreter in Germany attached to the Control commission (1946–48). He became a barrister, called to the bar by Lincoln's Inn in 1952.

Political career
Lyons contested Harrogate in 1964, but was elected Labour Party (UK) Member of Parliament for Bradford East in 1966. He served there until the constituency's abolition for the February 1974 general election, and then in Bradford West from February 1974 to 1983.

In 1979 Lyons secured an unusual swing to Labour (against the national trend), almost certainly as a result of heavy support amongst the Asian community angry at Margaret Thatcher's anti-immigrant rhetoric.

In March 1981, Lyons was one of the Labour MPs who defected to the Social Democratic Party. In the 1983 general election, Lyons polled 27% of the vote in Bradford West - and came third behind the new Labour candidate Max Madden.

Death
Lyons died on 23 April 2010 following a long illness.

References

Times Guide to the House of Commons, 1966 & 1983

External links
 

1926 births
2010 deaths
British King's Counsel
Labour Party (UK) MPs for English constituencies
20th-century King's Counsel
Social Democratic Party (UK) MPs for English constituencies
UK MPs 1966–1970
UK MPs 1970–1974
UK MPs 1974
UK MPs 1974–1979
UK MPs 1979–1983
People educated at Roundhay School
Jewish British politicians
Members of Parliament for Bradford West